Jewish country clubs are country clubs whose members are predominantly Jewish, having been excluded from other elite social clubs during periods of rising anti-Semitism in the late 19th and early 20th centuries. As a result, many major cities across the United States have at least one Jewish country club and, in cities with larger Jewish populations, often more than one, founded by wealthy Jews in that era.

Although Jews, along with other ethnic and religious minorities, continue to be excluded from some country clubs, informal policies excluding Jews began to wane starting in the 1960s. By the 1990s, and in the wake of the 1990 PGA Championship, even more clubs opened up their membership to Jews, African Americans, and others. With more options for wealthy Jews, many Jewish country clubs saw declining membership and failed; others lost their Jewish character and developed a more diverse membership base. Nevertheless, many Jewish country clubs retain their identity and still exist in major cities across the U.S; however, in the Philadelphia area, for example, all but one of the existing clubs no longer affiliate with the Jewish Federation, once seen as an important piece of their Jewish identity by raising funds for charity.

Origins
Many country clubs in the United States were established around the same time that immigration to the country, including of Jews, began to rise sharply. As anti-Semitism increased, Jews—even Jews who once had access to elite WASP social societies—were blackballed from joining clubs. By the early 20th century, most cities with meaningful Jewish populations had formed country clubs, and by 1928, there were 34 Jewish social and country clubs in the greater New York area, though many Jews still saw the inability to join non-Jewish social organizations as an impediment to assimilating and Americanizing.

Despite having been born of discrimination, Jewish country clubs often discriminated within the Jewish population. In the early years of the 20th century, membership at some clubs was restricted to German Jews, though as populations grew and intermarried, Russian and Polish Jews were also accepted.

According to a 1962 Anti-Defamation League survey of 803 country clubs, 224 were found to be non-discriminatory, while among the predominantly Christian clubs, 89 had quotas on the number of Jewish members and 416 admitted no Jews, though the Jewish Telegraphic Agency noted that social club discrimination was "in retreat" by the mid-1960s. Nevertheless,  some country clubs still admit few or no Jews.

Although Jewish country clubs have predominantly Jewish memberships, the clubs themselves are not particularly Jewish in terms of custom or practice—clubs tend to be open on Shabbat and serve non-kosher food. The names and architecture of clubs are not recognizably Jewish and often mimicked the convention of the other, predominantly Protestant country club from which Jews were excluded.

Decline
Starting in the 1960s, more Jews were accepted into predominantly Christian country clubs, though change often came slowly until the 1990 PGA Championship, which called attention to discrimination in clubs and social organizations across the United States. Clubs were forced either to admit more African American and Jewish members or to lose future PGA tournaments; some opted to integrate, while others retained restrictions on blacks and Jews. In 1990 Tom Watson famously resigned from the Kansas City Country Club over its refusal to admit billionaire H&R Block founder Henry Bloch.

That freedom to assimilate has hurt Jewish country clubs. Between intermarriage, more geographically dispersed Jewish populations, fewer golfers, and a decline in country club membership generally, many Jewish country clubs have either had to fold, merge, or lose their Jewish identity. In cities with multiple Jewish country clubs, there is increasing consolidation. Three of the six Jewish country clubs in Baltimore closed between 1985 and 2010, for example.

Many clubs remain vibrant, however, particularly in areas with large Jewish populations or where other Jewish clubs have folded or no longer have predominantly Jewish membership.

In addition to demographic changes, the Madoff investment scandal hit Jewish country clubs particularly hard. Bernie Madoff was an avid golfer in both New York and Florida, and many members of Jewish country clubs had invested heavily in his Ponzi scheme.

When Woodmont Country Club, a Jewish country club in the Washington, D.C. area, promised membership to President Barack Obama after the end of his presidency, some of its members objected because of his actions towards Israel. The club ultimately admitted him. Doug Emhoff, the first Jewish spouse of a Vice President, is a member at Hillcrest Country Club in Los Angeles.

List of historically Jewish country clubs

 Beechmont Country Club in Orange, Ohio
 Brentwood Country Club in Los Angeles, California
 Broadmoor Country Club in Indianapolis, Indiana
 Brynwood Country Club in Milwaukee, Wisconsin
 Century Country Club in Purchase, New York
 Crestview Country Club in Agawam, Massachusetts
 El Caballero Country Club in Tarzana, California
 Engineers Country Club in Roslyn Harbor, New York
 Fenway Golf Club in Scarsdale, New York
 Franklin Hills Country Club in Franklin, Michigan
 Glendale Country Club in Bellevue, Washington
 Green Gables Country Club in Denver, Colorado
 Green Oaks Country Club in Verona, Pennsylvania
 Harmonie Club in Manhattan, New York
 Hillcrest Country Club in Los Angeles, California
 Idlewild Country Club in Flossmoor, Illinois
 Indian Spring Country Club in Indian Spring, Silver Spring, Maryland
 Inwood Country Club in Inwood, New York
 Irondequoit Country Club in Rochester, New York
 Jefferson Lakeside Country Club in Richmond, Virginia
 Kernwood Country Club in Salem, Massachusetts
 Knollwood Country Club in West Bloomfield, Michigan
 Lake Merced Golf Club in Daly City, California
 Lake Shore Country Club in Glencoe, Illinois
 Losantiville Country Club in Cincinnati, Ohio
 Meadowbrook Country Club in Ballwin, Missouri
 Meadowbrook Country Club in Tulsa, Oklahoma
 Moor Allerton in Leeds, England 
 Mountain Ridge Country Club in West Caldwell, New Jersey
 Northmoor Country Club in Highland Park, Illinois
 Oak Ridge Country Club in Hopkins, Minnesota
 Oakdale Golf & Country Club in Toronto, Ontario
 Oakwood Country Club in Cleveland Heights, Ohio
 Oakwood Country Club in Kansas City, Missouri
 Palm Beach Country Club in Palm Beach, Florida
 Philmont Country Club in Huntingdon Valley, Pennsylvania
 Pine Tree Country Club in Birmingham, Alabama
 Richmond Country Club in Richmond, British Columbia
 Ridgeway Country Club in Germantown, Tennessee
 The Standard Club in Johns Creek, Georgia
 Standard Club in Louisville, Kentucky
 The Suburban Club in Pikesville, Maryland
 Sunningdale Country Club in Scarsdale, New York
 Tualatin Country Club in Tualatin, Oregon
 Tumble Brook Country Club in Bloomfield, Connecticut
 The World Famous Twin Orchard Country Club in Long Grove, Illinois
 Westmoreland Country Club in Export, Pennsylvania
 Westwood Country Club in Buffalo, New York
 Westwood Country Club in Houston, Texas
 Westwood Country Club in St. Louis, Missouri
 Woodholme Country Club in Pikesville, Maryland
 Woodmont Country Club in Rockville, Maryland

See also
 Country club
 Gentleman's Agreement
 Membership discrimination in California clubs
 Red Oaks, an Amazon Prime Video series set at a Jewish country club

References

Jewish clubs and societies
Jewish organizations based in the United States
Jewish organizations
Antisemitism in the United States
Golf in the United States